Florence Edem Apefa Ezeh (born December 29, 1977 in Lomé) is a female hammer thrower from Togo, who previously represented France during her career. She set her personal best (68.03 metres) on August 9, 2002 at the European Championships in Munich. Ezeh attended the Southern Methodist University in Dallas, Texas.

Biography 
A student at the Southern Methodist University at Dallas, she won the NCAA championships in 1999, 2000 and 2001. Competing for Athlé 78 up to 1995, then the Racing Club de France from 1996 to 2004, then the CA Montreuil 93 at the end of 1995, she had an outstanding season in 1999 by winning the Hammer Throw at the 1999 European Championships U23s, at Gothenburg, with a hurl of 64.56m. She set six times the Senior French record of the Hammer Throw: 56.52m  8 July 1995 at Bondoufle, 57.74m  29 June 1996 at Montgeron, 58.28m  31 July 1996 at Lamballe, 65.15m and 65.41m  20 March 1999 at Austin (Texas) and 66.13m  7 May 1999 at Denton.

In 2001, she won the Gold Medal at the Mediterranean Games, and made the final of the World Championships at Edmonton (7th).  The following year, she was fourth at the European Championships at Munich and established the best hurl of her career  (68.03m). 

Possessing double nationality, (Franco-Togolese), she decided to compete for her country of birth at the end of season 2005. She subsequently placed third at the 2007 African Games, second at the 2008 African Championships, then third at the following African Championships, in 2010. She holds the Togo record for the Hammer Throw (62.75m).

Achievements

See also
 List of nationality transfers in athletics

References

 
 hammerthrow.wz
 Profile

1977 births
Living people
French female hammer throwers
Togolese hammer throwers
Sportspeople from Lomé
Togolese emigrants to France
SMU Mustangs women's track and field athletes
Southern Methodist University alumni
Mediterranean Games gold medalists for France
Athletes (track and field) at the 2001 Mediterranean Games
World Athletics Championships athletes for France
World Athletics Championships athletes for Togo
Togolese female athletes
African Games silver medalists for Togo
African Games medalists in athletics (track and field)
Mediterranean Games medalists in athletics
Athletes (track and field) at the 2007 All-Africa Games
Athletes (track and field) at the 2011 All-Africa Games